Bwishyura is  sector in Karongi District, Western Province, Rwanda. Where the headquarters of Western Province located. The population in 2012 was 20,508.

References 

Western Province, Rwanda
Sectors of Rwanda